Heshan Dhanushka (born 30 May 1998) is a Sri Lankan cricketer. He made his List As debut on 14 December 2019, for Colts Cricket Club in the 2019–20 Invitation Limited Over Tournament. He made his first-class debut on 14 February 2020, for Colts Cricket Club in the 2019–20 Premier League Tournament. He made his Twenty20 debut on 4 March 2021, for Colts Cricket Club in the 2020–21 SLC Twenty20 Tournament.

References

External links
 

1998 births
Living people
Sri Lankan cricketers
Colts Cricket Club cricketers
Place of birth missing (living people)